Vitka Kempner (14 March 1920, Kalisz – 2012) was a Polish Jewish partisan leader during World War II. She served in the United Partisan Organization (Fareynikte Partizaner Organizatsye) and, alongside Rozka Korczak and founder Abba Kovner, assumed a leadership role in its successor group, the Avengers (Nokmim).

Early career 
Kempner was 19 when the Germans invaded Poland, and she fled to Vilnius, Lithuania. When Lithuania fell to the Germans eight months later, Kempner and tens of thousands of other Jews were forced into a ghetto, where she met Korczak and Kovner. During World War II, their United Partisan Organization, or the FPO, was one of the most famous and successful Jewish partisan groups during the war, responsible for acts of sabotage against the Nazis. Kempner played an integral leading role in the organization, and is famous for blowing up a Nazi train line with a homemade bomb. She and her compatriots smuggled weapons through the city's sewer system, Kempner eventually becoming one of Kovner's closest lieutenants.

The Avengers 
After a failed ghetto revolt drove them out of Vilnius, the United Partisan Organization became the Avengers. This militia was based in Rudniki Forest, and from there, they continued to sabotage Nazi operations. They destroyed Vilnius's power and water systems, operating in secret and looting peasant homes to stay alive. They lived in the forest for nine months, until Vilnius was occupied by Soviet forces, aided by the partisans.

Post-War 
After the war ended in 1945, Kempner and Kovner continued to fight against the Nazis. They helped evacuate hundreds of European Jews to British Palestine. Kovner also formed a new resistance group known as Nakam, or Revenge. Their goal was to take revenge on the Germans by poisoning the waterworks of important cities, but Kovner was arrested before they could put their plans to action. On April 13, 1946, Kempner and others infiltrated a bakery that supplied bread for Nazi POWs in Nuremberg. They coated 2,300 loaves of bread with arsenic before a guard was alerted and they were forced to flee. Many of the POWs fell ill, but none were reported dead.

Family life 
Kempner and Kovner married in 1946. In the same year, they moved to British Palestine, where they had two children. Kovner became a poet, and Kempner a clinical psychologist. They had forty years together before Kovner died in 1987. Kempner died in her home in Israel in 2012.

Kempner is remembered in the song Shtil, di nakht iz oysgeshternt by Hirsh Glick, which celebrates her heroic attack on a German convoy in the Vilnius sector in 1942.

References 

1920 births
2012 deaths
People from Kalisz
Polish emigrants to Mandatory Palestine
Israeli people of Polish-Jewish descent
Jewish partisans
Nakam
Female resistance members of World War II
Vilna Ghetto inmates